Contemplate (The Reason You Exist) is Kai Tracid's third artist album, released on 24 February 2003.

Track listing

References 

Kai Tracid albums
2003 albums